The Greeley Masonic Temple is a Colonial Revival style historic building in Greeley, Colorado.  It was built in 1927 and was listed on the National Register of Historic Places in 2004. 

The building was deemed architecturally significant as a work by architect William N. Bowman.  It is a brick building with blond brick pilasters.  Within the Colonial Revival style generally, it reflects "a modernist interpretation of Georgian Revival architecture".

Bowman was a prolific architect, a Mason, and had been president of Colorado's chapter of the American Institute of Architects during 1917 to 1919.

See also 
 National Register of Historic Places listings in Weld County, Colorado

References

External links 

 

Colonial Revival architecture in Colorado
Buildings and structures in Weld County, Colorado
Masonic buildings in Colorado
Clubhouses on the National Register of Historic Places in Colorado
National Register of Historic Places in Weld County, Colorado